Trinomial coefficient may refer to:
 coefficients in the trinomial expansion of (a + b + c)n.
 coefficients in the trinomial triangle and expansion of (x2 + x + 1)n.